Achdé, the pseudonym of Hervé Darmenton (born July 30, 1961), is a French comic book writer and artist. The pseudonym is based on the French pronunciation of his initials, "H.D." (similar to Hergé and Jijé). After the death of Morris, the creator of Lucky Luke, Achdé continued the task of drawing new Lucky Luke stories from 2003 onwards.

Career
Before dedicating himself to his craft, Achdé worked as a doctor with a specialty in radiology, but abandoned a career in medicine in 1985 to dedicate himself fully to drawing.  He began illustrating newspapers and self-published Destins Croisés, his first comic book, in 1988. He joined the French publishing house Dargaud in 1991 and created several new series, alone and in partnership, including Fort Braillard, Woker (which concerns an interplanetary Tarzan), and Doc Véto.  In 1993, he launched the series CRS=Détresse, CRS being a reference to the Compagnies Républicaines de Sécurité, the French security forces attached to the national police force, who are deployed during riots and demonstrations.

Following the death of Morris, Achdé was given the assignment to carry on the Lucky Luke series in collaboration with writer Laurent Gerra, and has stated, "For me it's been a childhood dream; when I was little, Lucky Luke was my favorite hero, and when I was young I knew I wanted to be a cartoonist."

Notes

References
 Achdé publications in Spirou BDoubliées 
 Achdé albums Bedetheque

External links 
 Achdé biography on Lambiek Comiclopedia
 Interview with Achdé, Barcelona, 2005 

1961 births
Living people
Writers from Lyon
French comics writers
French comics artists
Artists from Lyon